Edward Buckler Kirby (October 30, 1901 - July 5, 1968) was an American athlete who competed mainly in the 3000 metre team. He competed for the United States in the 1924 Summer Olympics held in Paris, France in the 3000 metre team where he won the bronze medal with his team mates William Cox and Willard Tibbetts.

Kirby graduated from Cornell University in 1924 and was a member of the Sphinx Head Society. He was born in Washington, D. C. and died in New York City.

References

External links
profile

1901 births
1968 deaths
American male long-distance runners
Athletes (track and field) at the 1924 Summer Olympics
Cornell University alumni
Olympic bronze medalists for the United States in track and field
Medalists at the 1924 Summer Olympics